The South African Railways Class 5B 4-6-2 of 1904 was a steam locomotive from the pre-Union era in the Cape of Good Hope.

In 1904, the Cape Government Railways placed four Karoo Class  Pacific type passenger steam locomotives in service.

Manufacturer
Following on the success of the first two Karoo Class locomotives of the Cape Government Railways (CGR), a further four were ordered from Beyer, Peacock and Company in 1904 and delivered in that same year. In view of the experience gained with the original two Karoo Class locomotives, their design was modified slightly by CGR Chief Locomotive Superintendent H.M. Beatty.

They were numbered in the range from 905 to 908 and, like the previous two locomotives, they were also not allocated class numbers by the CGR. Instead, they were also known as the Karoo Class, from the region of the Western System where they were designed to work.

The type YE1 tender was introduced along with these locomotives. It rode on three axles and had a capacity of  coal and  water.

Characteristics

This increase still did not allow sufficient clearance between the boiler barrel and the  diameter coupled wheels. Pockets in the boiler barrel, similar to those used on the earlier locomotives, were therefore still necessary. The boilers of the first two locomotives, numbers 905 and 906, were fitted with Coale patent safety valves, while numbers 907 and 908 had Ramsbottom safety valves. The eccentrics and motion were actuated from the driving (centre) axle instead of the trailing axle.

South African Railways

When the Union of South Africa was established on 31 May 1910, the three Colonial government railways (CGR, Natal Government Railways and Central South African Railways) were united under a single administration to control and administer the railways, ports and harbours of the Union. Although the South African Railways and Harbours came into existence in 1910, the actual classification and renumbering of all the rolling stock of the three constituent railways were only implemented with effect from 1 January 1912.

In 1912, these four locomotives were renumbered in the range from 723 to 726 and designated Class 5B on the South African Railways (SAR).

Modifications

Piston valves and smokebox
In the early 1930s, A.G. Watson, CME of the SAR at the time, endeavoured to improve some of the older locomotive classes in various ways. The Class 5B were fitted with superheating, piston valves and a redesigned smokebox arrangement which resulted in an exhaust which has been described as "positively startling" when the regulator was opened up. At the same time, their running boards were raised clear of the coupled wheels. This modification made the as-built wheel fairings on the running boards unnecessary and resulted in a locomotive with a North American rather than a British appearance.

Trofimoff piston valves
During September 1931, Watson fitted engine no. 726 with Trofimoff type by-pass piston valves as an experiment. The Trofimoff valve was claimed to afford ideal conditions when drifting. On no. 726, the experiment was less than successful and, after having the covers blown off a couple of times through too sudden opening of the regulator, the Trofimoff piston valves were removed.

The Trofimoff piston valve consisted of two fixed discs secured to the valve spindle, and two junk rings, each carrying a bull ring and four valve rings and both free to move longitudinally on the spindle. When the regulator is opened, steam forces the loose valve bodies against their respective fixed discs and they then act as units, similar to ordinary piston valves. When steam is shut off, the loose valve heads become detached from their respective discs and remain in their idle positions near the centre of the steam chest, while the valve spindle and fixed disks continue their reciprocating motion with the spindle sliding freely through the now stationary loose valve heads, and with the steam and exhaust ports now in communi­ca­tion. With both ends of the cylinders now in communication, the use of ordinary by-bass or snifting valves became unnecessary.

The first such experiment was carried out on Class 16C no. 851. Further similar experiments were carried out on Class 16B no. 805 in July 1932, Class 16DA no. 876 in August 1932, Class 15CA no. 2852 in March 1933 and finally on Class 15A no. 1961. The results of these extended tests did not prove entirely satisfactory and all these engines were gradually refitted with standard piston valves and snifting valves.

Experimental chimney
The same locomotive, no. 726, was also fitted with an experimental chimney designed by Watson. A similar chimney, the shape of which earned it a nickname that referred to a night bucket, was also tested on Class 8D no. 1197. This experiment did not result in further production.

Split crossheads
In another experiment, one of the class was fitted with split crossheads. The split was on the vertical centre line and the two halves were bolted together over the end of the piston rod. The end of the piston rod and its nesting inside the crosshead halves were grooved in an arrangement similar to a nut and bolt, but with parallel grooves. The experiment was not a success, since the rods managed to work themselves loose. One of the front cylinder covers was blown off along with parts of the cylinder itself and the idea was abandoned.

Watson Standard boilers
In the 1930s, many serving locomotives were reboilered with a standard boiler type, designed by Watson as part of his standardisation policy. Such Watson Standard reboilered locomotives were reclassified by adding an "R" suffix to their classification.

Only one of the Class 5B locomotives, no. 725, was eventually reboilered with a Watson Standard no. 1 boiler and reclassified to Class 5BR. While the original boiler was fitted with Ramsbottom safety valves, the Watson Standard boiler was fitted with Pop safety valves.

The reboilering required extensive modifications to the frame under the firebox. The Beatty-designed bridle casting was removed and the bar frames extended backwards under the firebox to the rear drag box. This frame modification turned out to be a weak point in the more powerful rebuilt engine, with the result that she was never again favoured for road work and spent most of her later service life more or less permanently confined to the Culemborg carriage yard.

Service
In service, the Class 5B locomotives performed excellently.

They spent a large part of their working lives in the Karoo, working between Beaufort West and De Aar, until they were displaced by larger locomotives and assigned to the Paardeneiland shed in Cape Town. Some remained in service around Cape Town for many years and became familiar sights on the Strand and Stellenbosch suburban trains, until the last locomotive of this Class was withdrawn by 1969.

Upon withdrawal, no. 723 was plinthed at Strand station. It was subsequently moved to De Aar, where it was observed in April 1980 as part of the well-known and well-maintained collection of preserved locomotives. No. 723, as well as most of the other locomotives in the De Aar collection, were subsequently relocated to Millsite near Krugersdorp.

Preservation
Of the Class 5B, one survived into preservation. By 2018

Illustration
The main picture shows no. 723 while it was still plinthed at Strand station. The first of the following pictures shows the Class 5B, as built with Coale safety valves, in the CGR's green livery with a polished brass dome cover, with its original low running boards with wheel fairings or splashers and its original Type YE1 tender. It is depicted here on a colourised CGR post card which also shows the CGR's crest. The second shows no. 724 in the all-black livery of the SAR, after being equipped with superheating, Ramsbottom safety valves, piston valve cylinders, raised running boards and a modified tender. The third shows Class 5BR no. 725 with Pop safety valves on a Watson Standard no. 1 boiler.

References

1300
1300
1300
4-6-2 locomotives
2′C1′ n2 locomotives
Beyer, Peacock locomotives
Cape gauge railway locomotives
Railway locomotives introduced in 1904
1904 in South Africa
2′C1′ h2 locomotives